Tehrangeles (or Little Persia) is a portmanteau deriving from the combination of Tehran, the capital of Iran, and Los Angeles. A Persian community developed in Westwood, Los Angeles after the Islamic Revolution of 1979 prompted thousands of Iranians to flee to the United States. It is a shopping, eating and gathering place for the large number (estimates range from 500,000 to 600,000) of Iranian-Americans and their descendants residing in the Los Angeles metropolitan area which is the largest such population outside Iran. The intersection of Westwood Boulevard and Wilkins Avenue was recognized by the City of Los Angeles as Persian Square.

Origin
A Persian community originally centered in the Westwood neighborhood of the Westside in the 1960s. Immigration to the area increased several-fold due to the events surrounding the 1979 Revolution in Iran. Westwood Boulevard became known for its many Persian shops and restaurants including being a gathering place for men in restaurants and tea shops. The Iranian expatriate community of Los Angeles entered a wide variety of media including magazines, newspapers, radio, and television stations and  contributed greatly to production of modern global Iranian culture while in diaspora.

Distribution
As the population has grown, Iranians and their American-born children have settled in neighborhoods throughout Los Angeles, including Tarzana, Woodland Hills, Encino, and Beverly Hills, as well as the cities of Irvine, Huntington Beach and elsewhere in Orange County. They have also made their homes in San Diego and the Palm Springs area of the Coachella Valley.

Economy 

The economy of Tehrangeles demonstrates key features of ethnic enclave economics, providing a wider range of employment opportunities than the general market by virtue of its cultural (Iranian) specificity, and as such provides a feasible method for Iranian immigrants to find employment and economic integration. 

Tehrangeles is home to a sizable community of Iranian immigrant entrepreneurs who own their own businesses. Business signs are commonly in Persian, which is also spoken in the shops. Iranian-owned businesses are particularly prevalent on Westwood Boulevard between Wilshire Boulevard in Westwood to Pico Boulevard.

In popular culture
In 2012, Bravo began broadcasting the series Shahs of Sunset, set in the Iranian community in LA. In 2018 the novel Tehrangeles, a romantic comedy set in the community, was published.

See also

 History of the Iranian Americans in Los Angeles
 Iranian American
Iranian diaspora
 Freedom Sculpture

References

External links 

 
Yara Elmjouie: Being an Iranian American - Al Jazeera travels to Los Angeles' 'Tehrangeles' to explore the complexities of being an Iranian American. Al Jazeera English, May 2018

Ethnic enclaves in California
Iranian emigrants to the United States
Iranian-American culture in Los Angeles
Persian communities outside Iran
Neighborhoods in Los Angeles
Westside (Los Angeles County)